Fábio André Tavares Desidério (born 22 January 2001) is a Portuguese professional footballer who plays as a forward for Coventry City.

Career

Rochdale
On 28 June 2019, Tavares signed his first professional contract with Rochdale. Tavares made his professional debut for Rochdale in a 3-0 EFL League One loss to Wycombe Wanderers F.C. on 28 September 2019. On 21 February 2020, Tavares joined National League North side Curzon Ashton on loan until the end of the season.

Coventry City
On 1 February 2021, Tavares signed for Coventry City on a two-and-a-half year contract for an undisclosed fee.

On 19 February 2022, Tavares made his first-team debut for Coventry as an 85th minute substitute (replacing Martyn Waghorn) against Barnsley at the CBS Arena. On 26 February 2022, Tavares scored his first goal for Coventry in a 1-1 draw against Preston North End at the CBS Arena. Tavares came on for his second appearance as a substitute in the 94th minute (replacing Callum O'Hare), and scored a magnificent equaliser with the last kick of the game in the 98th minute. Preston failed to clear a free kick deep in stoppage time, and Tavares bent a sublime right-footed shot into the top corner to salvage the game.

Career statistics

References

External links
 
 Rochdale AFC Profile

2001 births
Living people
Sportspeople from Matosinhos
Portuguese footballers
Association football forwards
Rochdale A.F.C. players
Curzon Ashton F.C. players
Coventry City F.C. players
English Football League players
National League (English football) players